Olímpia Futebol Clube, commonly referred to as Olímpia, is a Brazilian professional association football club based in Olímpia, São Paulo. The team competes in the Campeonato Paulista Segunda Divisão, the fourth tier of the São Paulo state football league.

They competed in the Série A once.

The club's home colours are blue and white and the team mascot is a rooster.

History
The club was founded on December 5, 1946. Dom Pedro competed in the 2000 edition of the Série A, named Copa João Havelange. The club participated in the White Group, reaching the Third Stage of the competition. They won the Campeonato Paulista Série A2 in 1990, and the Campeonato Paulista Série A3
in 2000 and in 2007.

Achievements

 Campeonato Paulista Série A2:
 Winners (1): 1990
 Campeonato Paulista Série A3:
 Winners (1): 2007

Stadium

Olímpia Futebol Clube play their home games at Estádio Tereza Breda. The stadium has a maximum capacity of 15,022 people.

References

External links
 Official website

 
Football clubs in São Paulo (state)
Association football clubs established in 1946
1946 establishments in Brazil